Valadon may refer to:

Suzanne Valadon (1865–1938), French painter
Maurice Utrillo (1883–1955), born Maurice Valadon, Suzanne Valadon's son and fellow painter
Rosemary Valadon (born 1947), Australian painter, winner of the Archibald Prize and other awards 
Paul Valadon (1867–1913), German-born magician, one-time assistant of John Nevil Maskelyne 
Gabrielle Valadon, a main character in the film The Private Life of Sherlock Holmes
6937 Valadon, an asteroid named after Suzanne Valadon
Valadon (crater), a crater on Venus named after Suzanne Valadon (see list of craters on Venus)